Newbold is both a surname and a given name. Notable people with the name include:

Surname:
 Alf Newbold (1921–2002), English footballer
 Charles Newbold (b. 1780), American inventor
 Ethel Newbold (1882–1933), English epidemiologist and statistician
 Gregory S. Newbold, United States Marine Corps general
 Joshua G. Newbold (1830–1903), Governor of Iowa 1877–78
Marjory Newbold (1883–1926), Scottish socialist and communist, prominent in the Independent Labour Party and in the 'Red Clydeside' movement
 Soon Hee Newbold (born 1974), Korean born American composer
 Tricia Newbold, American government employee and whistleblower
 Walton Newbold (1888–1943), British Member of Parliament

Given name:
 Newbold Black, American hockey player
 Newbold Morris (1902–1966), American politician and lawyer
 Newbold Noyes, Jr. (1918–1997), American publisher, journalist and newspaper editor

See also
Newbolt
Newbould

English-language surnames